Schlägl is a town and a former municipality in Rohrbach District in the Austrian state of Upper Austria. On 1 May 2015 Schlägl municipality was merged with Aigen im Mühlkreis to form Aigen-Schlägl municipality.

As of 1 January 2018, population of the town was 430.

Geography
Schlägl is lying in the upper Mühlviertel. About 55 percent of the municipality is forest, and 40 percent is farmland.

Forestry
Schägl contains a monastic order in which famously developed was the target diameter harvesting method.

References

Cities and towns in Rohrbach District